Kiskiminetas may refer to the following places in Pennsylvania:

Kiskiminetas River, a tributary of the Allegheny River
Kiskiminetas Junction, Pennsylvania, Westmoreland County
Kiskiminetas Township, Armstrong County, Pennsylvania